Raymond Denny Nelson Jr. (born December 12, 1965), is an animator, voice actor, cartoonist and writer, best known for creating the Canadian animated series Flying Rhino Junior High. Nelson is also well known for his involvement in the books that inspired the series. He initially started out as an animator at Will Vinton Studios, but left in 1993 to form his personal animation studio, Flying Rhinoceros, which was closed in 2016.

References

Living people
1965 births
Artists from Portland, Oregon
Animators from Oregon